The Ice Hockey Federation of Russia (Federatsiya Khokkeya Rossii) is the governing body overseeing ice hockey in Russia. In 2019, Russia had 110,624 ice hockey players registered with its ice hockey federation. After the 2022 Russian invasion of Ukraine, the International Ice Hockey Federation suspended Russia from all levels of competition.

History

The federation was founded on 12 November 1991, during the existence of the Soviet Union and the Russian SFSR, as the "Ice Hockey Federation of the Russian Soviet Federated Socialist Republic / Ice Hockey Federation of Russia" ( / ). On 19 January 1992, after the Soviet Union was dissolved and Russia took over the international rights and obligations of the Soviet Union, the federation became the official successor of the Soviet Union Ice Hockey Federation and its successes and its full membership in the International Ice Hockey Federation.

After the 2022 Russian invasion of Ukraine, the International Ice Hockey Federation suspended Russia from all levels of competition.

National teams

Men
 Men's national ice hockey team
 Men's national under-20 ice hockey team
 Men's national under-18 ice hockey team

Women
 Women's national ice hockey team
 Women's national under-18 ice hockey team

Leagues

Active
 Kontinental Hockey League (KHL) – highest men's hockey league in Europe and Asia (since 2008)
 Women's Hockey League (ZhHL) – top–tier women's hockey league in Russia and China (since 1995; reorganized in 2015)
 Supreme Hockey League (VHL) – second highest men's league (since 2010)
 Supreme Hockey League Championship (VHL-B) – third highest men's league (since 2011)
Asia League Ice Hockey (ALIH) – fourth highest men's league (since 2003)
Junior Hockey League (MHL) – men's junior league (since 2009)
National Junior Hockey League (NMHL) – men's junior league (since 2011)

Defunct
 International Hockey League – former highest men's league (1992–1996)
 Russian Superleague – former highest men's league, succeeding the International Hockey League (1996–2008)
 Russian Hockey Second League – fourth highest men's league

Notable leadership
 Yury Karandin, president of the Siberia–Far East branch of the Ice Hockey Federation of Russia since 1991
 Yuri Korolev, vice-president of the Ice Hockey Federation of Russia from 1992 to 2001, and secretary general from 2001 to 2003
 Andrey Starovoytov, general secretary of the Soviet Union Ice Hockey Federation from 1969 to 1986
 Vladislav Tretiak, president of the Ice Hockey Federation of Russia since 2006

See also
 Ice hockey in Russia
 List of Soviet and Russian ice hockey champions

References

External links
Official website
IIHF profile

1991 establishments in Russia
Russia
Ice hockey in Russia
Russia
Ice hockey
Sports organizations established in 1991